Kate Evelyn Luard,  (29 June 1872 – 16 August 1962), was a British nurse in the Second Boer War and First World War who was awarded the Royal Red Cross and Bar. She was the author of two books describing her experiences.

Early life
Luard was born in Aveley vicarage on 29 June 1872. Her father was Bixby Garnham Luard, the vicar of Aveley between 1871 and 1895. Her mother was Clara Isabella Sandford Bramston. She had twelve brothers and sisters, three of whom were born after her. She subsequently moved to Birch, Essex after her father was appointed to that living.
She was educated at Croydon High School, where the headmistress, Dorinda Neligan, had served as a nurse at the Siege of Metz during the Franco Prussian War in 1870–71. Luard worked as a teacher and governess in order to pay for nursing training at King's College Hospital, London.

War service
Luard served as a nurse in the Second Boer War and was one of the first nurses to join the British Expeditionary Force at the start of the First World War. She arrived in France on 8 August 1914 and was therefore listed as eligible for the 1914 Star, with a clasp because she served under enemy fire, although it is not clear whether she received it. Initially, she worked on ambulance trains bringing the wounded from the battlefields. During the war she was twice mentioned in despatches and was awarded the Royal Red Cross and Bar. The first award of the Royal Red Cross was gazetted in January 1916, and the bar in May 1918. Luard was Head Sister of No. 32 Casualty Clearing Station at Brandhoek during the Battle of Passchendaele. 

She resigned from the Queen Alexandra's Imperial Military Nursing Service (Reserve) shortly after the Armistice because of the illness of her father.

Post war

After this the war, Luard worked in the South London Hospital for Women, and as a matron at a boys school. She retired to Wickham Bishops in Essex, where she died on 16 August 1962.

Publications
Luard is the author of two accounts of her experiences in the war:
 Diary of a Nursing Sister on the Western Front, William Blackwood & Sons, 1915 (published anonymously);
 Unknown Warriors, the Letters of Kate Luard, History Press Limited, 2017.

References

1872 births
1962 deaths
Burials in Essex
Military personnel from Essex
British women in World War I
Female nurses in World War I
Members of the Royal Red Cross
People educated at Croydon High School
People from Aveley
Queen Alexandra's Royal Army Nursing Corps officers